Chungjeongno Station is a subway station on Seoul Subway Line 2 and Seoul Subway Line 5. It is located in Seodaemun-gu, which is a district in Seoul, South Korea. Chungjeong was the pen name of minister Min Yeong-hwan, who committed suicide protesting the signing of the Japan–Korea Treaty of 1905.

References

Seoul Metropolitan Subway stations
Railway stations opened in 1984
Metro stations in Seodaemun District
1984 establishments in South Korea
20th-century architecture in South Korea